Glenea lineatopunctata is a species of beetle in the family Cerambycidae. It was described by Stephan von Breuning in 1950. It is known from Borneo.

References

lineatopunctata
Beetles described in 1950